Orgeat syrup is a sweet syrup made from almonds, sugar, and rose water or orange flower water. It was originally made with a barley-almond blend. It has a pronounced almond taste and is used to flavor many cocktails. Orgeat syrup is an important ingredient in the Mai Tai and many Tiki drinks.

History
An early recipe for orgeat can be found in The English and Australian Cookery Book: 

Bitter almonds as a general rule contain cyanide and can be lethal in large quantities. For this reason modern syrups generally are produced only from sweet almonds. Such syrup products do not contain significant levels of hydrocyanic acid, so are generally considered safe for human consumption unless the person is allergic.

Word origin
The word orgeat is derived from the Latin  'made with barley' through the French, where barley is called . The Catalan word , from which derives the Spanish , has the same origin, though today the two drinks have little else in common and neither of them uses barley.

Regional uses

In Tunisia and Libya, a variant is called rozata and is usually served chilled in wedding and engagement parties as a symbol of joy and purity because of its white colour and its fresh (flowery) flavor. It comes in many different flavours, such as traditional almond, banana, mango, pistachio, among others.

In Suriname, there is a drink called , which is a  similar syrup made of sugar and sweet and bitter almonds.

Maltese  is made of almond and vanilla essence and may include cinnamon and cloves. 

Soumada has a very ancient history at least in Cyprus, stretching back into the Roman period, and it was given as an exotic delicacy by King Peter I of Cyprus to King Casimir the Great of Poland at the Congress of Kraków, held in Poland in 1364.

See also
Horchata, a related Valencian drink
Falernum syrup
Fassionola syrup
Drink mixers
 List of syrups
Tiki drinks

References

External links

Drink mixers
Syrup
Greek cuisine
Cypriot cuisine
Libyan cuisine
Tunisian cuisine
Israeli cuisine
Almonds